Philip Tabane (25 March 1934 – 18 May 2018) was a South African musician, vocalist, jazz guitarist and band leader.

He was born in rural Ga Ramotshegoa northeast of Pretoria into a family of guitarists. His mother was a spiritual healer.

He led the group Malombo. His music was heavily influenced by Sepedi chants and rhythms which are reputed to have spiritual healing powers. His chants invoked the powers of departed ancestors. His music was very popular among participants in the early years of the Black Consciousness Movement.

Tabane had significant international success and played with musicians of the calibre of Miles Davis and Herbie Hancock.

He died in Pretoria at the age of 84.

Discography

Castle Lager Jazz Festival 1964 - 1964
The Indigenous Afro-Jazz Sounds Of Phillip Tabane and His Malombo Jazzmen — 1969	
Man Philly - 1986
Philip Tabane & Malombo - 1988		
Unh! — 1989			
Silent Beauty -	1989			
Ke A Bereka - 1996			
Muvhango — 1998 
Live at the Market Theatre - 2010

References 

1934 births
2018 deaths
South African musicians
South African jazz musicians